The 2009 European F3 Open Championship was the first season with the new championship denomination after eight seasons of the Spanish Formula Three Championship. It began on 2 May 2009 in Valencia and will end on 1 November in Montmeló after 16 rounds in five different countries. The main Class A title was claimed by Bruno Méndez, holding off Celso Míguez by just two points. Callum MacLeod won the secondary Copa F306/300, as well as finishing ninth in the overall championship. Méndez's team Campos Racing also claimed the teams title, beating main rivals Drivex by seven points.

Teams and drivers
 All cars are powered by Fiat engines. Main class powered by Dallara F308, while Copa Class by Dallara F306 chassis.
{|
|

Calendar

Standings

Class A
Points are awarded as follows:

Copa F306/300
Points are awarded for both races as follows:

Team Standings
 Points for each team's best scoring chassis are awarded for both races as follows:

 All teams use Dallara chassis; the car designation is listed in the Chassis column.

References

External links
 Official website of the European F3 Open Championship

European F3 Open
Euroformula Open Championship seasons
Formula Three
Euroformula Open